Port Macquarie Airport  is an airport in Port Macquarie, New South Wales, Australia. The ownership is not to be confused with the Port Macquarie Airport Proprietary Limited. The airport had 222,534 revenue passengers, the 32nd busiest in Australia, and 4,821 aircraft movements in 2017–2018.

Airlines and destinations

Virgin Australia
On 4 February 2008, Virgin Blue (now Virgin Australia) commenced direct scheduled services between Sydney and Port Macquarie. The flights operated daily in the morning. The service used to be operated by an Embraer E-170 aircraft, and was the first scheduled jet service for the airport. Connections were offered to all major Australian cities via Sydney. An increase to twice-daily service commenced 4 August 2008.

Competition by Virgin resulted in a significant drop in fare prices for the Port Macquarie - Sydney route, where Qantas previously operated a monopoly after Hazelton Airlines ceased services in 2001.

On 28 July 2011, Virgin Australia (in partnership with Skywest Airlines) announced its intention to commence a daily Brisbane to Port Macquarie service from October 2011. On 19 October 2011, Virgin Australia's ATR 72 departed on its first flight to Brisbane. The airline also announced that, as a result of the removal of Embraer 170 aircraft from its fleet, Sydney to Port Macquarie services would also be operated by ATR72 aircraft.

Both routes have since been withdrawn due to the removal of ATR72 aircraft from the Virgin Australia fleet in 2020.

Aircraft operations

Connections to Brisbane (via Coffs Harbour) by Brindabella Airlines ceased 31 December 2010, citing poor loads on the route. Despite this, Virgin Australia entered the route on 19 October 2011 as a daily service with their ATR72 aircraft.

In February 2022, Bonza announced that the airport would become one of its 17 destinations with the airline planning to fly to the Sunshine Coast and Melbourne from Port Macquarie

Statistics

See also
List of airports in New South Wales

References

External links
Port Macquarie Airport

Airports in New South Wales
Port Macquarie